Pawhuska Township is one of eleven townships in Camden County, Missouri, USA.  As of the 2000 census, its population was 5,617.

Geography
According to the United States Census Bureau, Pawhuska Township covers an area of 30.18 square miles (78.17 square kilometers); of this, 19.48 square miles (50.46 square kilometers, 64.55 percent) is land and 10.7 square miles (27.72 square kilometers, 35.46 percent) is water.

Cities, towns, villages
 Lake Ozark (partial)
 Osage Beach (partial)
 Village of Four Seasons

Unincorporated towns
 Four Seasons at 
 Laguna Beach at 
(This list is based on USGS data and may include former settlements.)

Adjacent townships
 Glaze Township, Miller County (east)
 Jackson Township (southeast)
 Kiheka Township (south)
 Osage Township (southwest)
 Jasper Township (west)
 Osage Township, Morgan County (northwest)

Cemeteries
The township contains these six cemeteries: Arnold, Conway, Downing, Houston, Riverview and Stevens.

Major highways
  U.S. Route 54
  Missouri Route 42

Airports and landing strips
 Eagles Roost Heliport
 Links Landing Seaplane Base
 Linn Creek-Grand Glaize Memorial Airport

Landmarks
 Lake of the Ozarks State Park (west edge)

School districts
 Camdenton R-III School District
 School Of The Osage R-II

Political districts
 Missouri's 4th congressional district
 Missouri's 4th congressional district
 State House District 115
 State House District 155
 State Senate District 33
 State Senate District 6

References
 United States Census Bureau 2008 TIGER/Line Shapefiles
 United States Board on Geographic Names (GNIS)
 United States National Atlas

External links
 US-Counties.com
 City-Data.com

Townships in Camden County, Missouri
Townships in Missouri